Jump is a 1999 film, directed and written by Justin McCarthy, and starring James LeGros, Mark Rosenthal and Jessica Hecht.

External links
 

1999 films
1999 comedy films